Tephritis simplex is a species of tephritid or fruit flies in the genus Tephritis of the family Tephritidae.

Distribution
Europe, Algeria, Tunisia, Crete, Turkey, Israel.

References

Tephritinae
Insects described in 1844
Diptera of Asia
Diptera of Europe